

November 2016

References 

 11
November 2016 events in the United States